Pozzato is an Italian surname. Notable people with the surname include:

Andrea Pozzato (born 1988), Italian footballer
Filippo Pozzato (born 1981), Italian cyclist

See also
Pozzallo

Italian-language surnames